Spain sent 5 competitors to compete in one discipline at the 2010 Winter Paralympics in Vancouver, British Columbia, Canada.

Medalists
The following Spanish athletes won medals at the Games.

Alpine skiing
Women

Men

See also
Spain at the 2010 Winter Olympics

External links
Vancouver 2010 Paralympic Games official website
International Paralympic Committee official website

Nations at the 2010 Winter Paralympics
2010
Para